Ring theory is the branch of mathematics in which rings are studied: that is, structures supporting both an addition and a multiplication operation. This is a glossary of some terms of the subject.

For the items in commutative algebra (the theory of commutative rings), see glossary of commutative algebra. For ring-theoretic concepts in the language of modules, see also Glossary of module theory.

For specific types of algebras, see also: Glossary of field theory and Glossary of Lie groups and Lie algebras. Since, currently, there is no glossary on not-necessarily-associative algebra-structures in general, this glossary includes some concepts that do not need associativity; e.g., a derivation.

A

B

C

D

E

F

G

H

I

J

K

L

M

N

O

P

Q

R

S

T

U

V

Z

See also
 Glossary of module theory

Notes

References
 

Jacobson, Nathan (2009), Basic Algebra 1 (2nd ed.), Dover
Jacobson, Nathan (2009), Basic Algebra 2 (2nd ed.), Dover
Nathan Jacobson, Structure of Rings

Ring theory
 
Wikipedia glossaries using description lists